Gregory Donald Pruitt (born August 18, 1951) is an American former professional football player who was a running back in the National Football League (NFL) from 1973 through 1984. He was selected to five Pro Bowls, four as a member of the Cleveland Browns and one as a member of the Los Angeles Raiders, the last one as a kick returner. He was also part of the Raiders' Super Bowl XVIII winning team, beating the Washington Redskins.

College career 
University of Oklahoma offensive line coach Bill Michael liked to recruit players from B.C. Elmore High School, where he recruited Pruitt. Pruitt was an All-American at the University of Oklahoma in 1971 and 1972, and was also named All-Big 8 in 1971 and 1972. He ranks third among Sooners in career all-purpose yards. 
Pruitt gained 3,122 rushing yards, 491 receiving yards, 139 yards on punt returns and 679 yards returning kickoffs. In total, he scored 41 career touchdowns as a Sooner. He came in second in Heisman Trophy voting in 1972, and third in 1971.

An African-American, Pruitt was one of the first Black Sooners players to achieve All-American status.
He established himself as Oklahoma’s best player during a time when other Southern Universities had not fully desegregated their Football teams. However, the Big Eight conference (which Oklahoma was a part of) established itself as the best collegiate football conference in the country by the start of the 1970s: each teamwas fully integrated, and much of their success owed largely to their Black Players. Pruitt’s performance against Southeastern Conference schools Alabama and Auburn in the 1971 and 1972 Sugar Bowls, respectively, helped accelerate each team’s integration expanding their recruitment of Black players.

NFL career 

Despite his stellar college career, concerns about his lack of size (he entered the draft at just 177 pounds) led to him not being drafted until Cleveland selected him with the 30th pick of the second round.  Pruitt played his first nine seasons in the NFL for the Cleveland Browns, leading the team in rushing five times and recording three 1,000 yard seasons.  Shortly before the 1982 season, Pruitt was traded to the Los Angeles Raiders for an 11th round draft pick.  He played his final three NFL seasons with the Raiders, used mainly as a return specialist.  In 1983, he led the league in punt returns (58), punt return yards (666, an NFL record), punt return touchdowns (1), and longest punt return (97 yards) as the team went on to win an NFL championship in Super Bowl XVIII.  Pruitt finished his career with 5,672 rushing yards, 3,069 receiving yards, 47 total touchdowns, and 13,262 all-purpose yards.

In 1979, Pruitt won ABC's Superstars, an all-around sports competition that pits elite athletes from different sports against one another in a series of athletic events resembling a decathlon.

Legacy 
In 1999, he was inducted to the College Football Hall of Fame.

The "Greg Pruitt rule" established tear-away jerseys as illegal.

References

External links
 
 

Living people
1951 births
All-American college football players
American Conference Pro Bowl players
American football running backs
Cleveland Browns players
College Football Hall of Fame inductees
Los Angeles Raiders players
Oklahoma Sooners football players
Players of American football from Houston
Sportspeople from Shaker Heights, Ohio